Palaquium supfianum is a tree in the family Sapotaceae.

Description
The twigs are brownish. Inflorescences bear up to five flowers.

Distribution and habitat
Palaquium supfianum is native to New Guinea. Its habitat is mixed dipterocarp forest at around  altitude.

References

supfianum
Trees of New Guinea
Plants described in 1905